James Grove (Jim) Fulton (March 1, 1903 – October 6, 1971) was an American politician who served as a member of the U.S. House of Representatives from Pennsylvania from 1945 to 1971.

Early life and education
James G. Fulton was born in Dormont, Pennsylvania.  He attended the Fine Arts Department of the Carnegie Institute of Technology in Pittsburgh, Pennsylvania, and graduated from Pennsylvania State College at State College, Pennsylvania in 1924 and from Harvard Law School as a Doctor of Laws in 1927.  He was a member of the Allegheny County Board of Law Examiners from 1934 to 1942.  He served in the Pennsylvania State Senate in 1939 and 1940.  He was solicitor for Dormont Borough in 1942.  He worked as publisher of the Mount Lebanon News and several other newspapers.  He was a member of the American Judicature Society, United World Federalists, American Legion and Veterans of Foreign Wars.

Military service
During the Second World War he enlisted in the United States Naval Reserve in 1942 and served in the South Pacific as a lieutenant until discharged in 1945.

United States House of Representatives

In 1944, while still in the service, Fulton was elected as a Republican to the 79th United States Congress, and reelected to the 13 succeeding Congresses, serving from January 3, 1945, until his death from a heart attack in Washington, D.C. on October 6, 1971.  While in Congress he was delegated to the United Nations Conference on Trade and Employment at Havana in 1947 and 1948, and to the 14th General Assembly of United Nations in 1959.  He was a delegate to 1956 Republican National Convention.  In addition he served as an adviser on space to the United States Mission at the United Nations from 1960 to 1969. Fulton voted in favor of the Civil Rights Acts of 1957, 1960, 1964, and 1968, as well as the 24th Amendment to the U.S. Constitution and the Voting Rights Act of 1965.

Space Shuttle
Fulton is credited with saving the Space Shuttle program.  After a heart attack in 1970, Fulton emerged from an ambulance to propose a compromise that eventually saved the funding for the program.

Legacy
He died of a heart attack on October 6, 1971 in Washington, D.C.  He is buried in Mt. Lebanon Cemetery in Pittsburgh, Pennsylvania.

As a memorial to Fulton, the Pittsburgh Foundation has created The James G. Fulton Legislative Internship Program in his honor.

The Congressman James Grove Fulton Memorial Post Office Building in Pittsburgh is named after him.

See also
 List of United States Congress members who died in office (1950–99)

References
 Retrieved on 2008-02-07
The Political Graveyard

Notes

1903 births
1971 deaths
People from Dormont, Pennsylvania
American Presbyterians
Republican Party members of the United States House of Representatives from Pennsylvania
Republican Party Pennsylvania state senators
American newspaper publishers (people)
People from Mt. Lebanon, Pennsylvania
20th-century American politicians
Journalists from Pennsylvania
Carnegie Mellon University alumni
Pennsylvania State University alumni
Harvard Law School alumni
Military personnel from Pennsylvania
United States Navy personnel of World War II
United States Navy officers
20th-century American journalists
American male journalists